The station Nürnberg Nordost (translates from German as Nuremberg North East), colloquial form Nordostbahnhof, is a railway station in Nuremberg, Germany.
It is a terminal station, providing a link to Gräfenberg, as the line to Gräfenberg has no connection to Nürnberg Hauptbahnhof, the city's main station.

The station has an interchange with the  line of the Nuremberg U-Bahn.

History
The station was built by the Royal Bavarian State Railways and opened on 1 July 1899 together with the Nuremberg Ring Railway section Nuremberg East-Nuremberg North. In the beginning it was only used for freight traffic, for which various loading tracks and a goods shed were built. Passenger traffic began with the opening of the Gräfenbergbahn on 1 February 1908, from which between 1911 and 1912 occasional journeys via the Nuremberg Ring Railway and the Nuremberg–Cheb railway to Nürnberg Hauptbahnhof were extended. With the exception of these connections, the station has since been operated as an island station for passenger transport, which was connected to Hauptbahnhof by tram until 1996 and by underground since then. In the 1990s, the loading of goods was abandoned, the tracks were gradually dismantled and the station building demolished. The last reconstruction took place with the refurbishment of the Gräfenbergbahn between July and September 1999. In addition to the construction of a new island platform and direct access to the Nordostbahnhof underground station, the overpass over the Äußere Bayreuther Straße (B 2) was renewed and a 208 m long siding was built.

Gallery

References

Nordost
Railway stations in Germany opened in 1899
1899 establishments in Bavaria